Zulmasuchus (meaning "Zulma Gasparini's crocodile") is an extinct genus of sebecid sebecosuchian mesoeucrocodylian. Its fossils have been found in Early Paleocene-age rocks (Danian stage) of the Santa Lucía Formation in Bolivia. Zulmasuchus was named in 2007 by Alfredo Paolillo and Omar Linares for fossils originally described by Buffetaut and Marshall in 1991 as Sebecus querejazus. Thus, the type species is Sebecus querezajus and the combinatio nova is Zulmasuchus querejazus.

References 

Sebecids
Paleocene crocodylomorphs
Paleocene reptiles of South America
Peligran
Tiupampan
Paleogene Bolivia
Fossils of Bolivia
Santa Lucía Formation
Fossil taxa described in 2007
Prehistoric pseudosuchian genera